Onyxx (Sidney Green) is a fictional mutant appearing in comic books published by Marvel Comics. He first appeared in X-Men, vol. 2 #171 and was created by Peter Milligan and Salvador Larroca.

Fictional character biography
Onyxx passes from various foster homes and orphanages, unable to find acceptance because of his crude behavior and chronic bedwetting.  Much to his delight, this chronic condition is cured when he mutates into the huge, hulking rock-like form we know him as today.  

Onyxx becomes a student at the Xavier Institute, assigned to Gambit's training squad, the Chevaliers. Onyxx has a romantic interest in a new student at the Institute by the named Foxx. It is later revealed that Foxx is actually a longtime adversary, Mystique, one of the X-Men.. She infiltrates the school to destabilize the relationship between Gambit and her foster daughter, Rogue. After having revealed herself to the X-Men, Onyxx attacks Mystique for not returning his affection. Mystique escapes and, with the help of an accomplice, injures Onyxx.

Onyxx's fellow student Bling is also attracted to Foxx, and their shared infatuation may be the basis of a friendship, since the two are often seen together. Bling once refers to Onyxx as "Randy," which could be interpreted as a playful nickname ("randy" being a synonym for "horny") but is more likely a writer's error.

Decimation
Sidney retains his powers post M-Day and continues residing at the school. Onyxx is critically injured by Reverend Stryker during his attack on the institute; barely surviving. Onyxx is later captured alongside his fellow students in Limbo. He is usually shown in the company of Bling.  He lives at the Xavier Institute in San Francisco.

Utopia
Onyxx, along with fellow students Mercury and Loa, is tasked with keeping peace at the riots on Telegraph Hill. This is after the mutant-hate group "Humanity Now!" marches from Sacramento to San Francisco to promote "Proposition X", displeasing many citizens of San Francisco, mutant and non-mutant alike. After the riots subside on Telegraph Hill, Cyclops comes and picks them up, taking them to City Hall. He is also seen in the company of Ariel when she arrives to pick up an injured Trance.

Necrosha and Death
Onyxx is seen amongst those under attack by Selene's new Inner Circle of death mutants on Utopia. Onyxx tries to sneak attack Wither while he is distracted by Dust, but Wither catches him and disintegrates him into rubble apparently killing him. He and the mutant Diamond Lil were casualties in Selene's attempt to gain a mystically charged knife.

Powers and abilities
Onyxx has a craggy granite body, which gives him superhuman strength and greater resistance to physical injury. He has also been seen to have a second pair of eyes, but it is unknown if these serve any special purpose.

References

Comics characters introduced in 2005
Fictional characters with superhuman durability or invulnerability
Marvel Comics characters with superhuman strength
Marvel Comics mutants
Marvel Comics superheroes
Characters created by Salvador Larroca
Characters created by Peter Milligan